The Machar Marshes are a large area of wetlands in the state of Upper Nile, South Sudan.  Estimates of their size vary. A 1950 study put the area of swamp at 6,500 km2.  A 1980 study put the area of permanent swamp at 8,700 km2., 60% of which was grass and forest.

The marshes are fed by waters from the Khor Machar (a distributary of the Baro River), the Yabus River and the Daga River.  At times of high water they are also fed by spill from the Pibor River.  The marshes are drained by the Adar River, a tributary of the White Nile.

References

External links 

 

Upper Nile (state)
Flooded grasslands and savannas
Grasslands of South Sudan
Swamps of Africa
Wetlands of South Sudan